Herotel previously known as Snowball Effect  is a South African Internet service provider (ISP) that provides internet access, hosting, VoIP, and web development services.

The business was founded by brothers Eugene and Storm van der Merwe in 1998. Initially Snowball offered web hosting and web development services but later added internet connectivity.

Snowball is a founding member of WAPA (Wireless Access Provider's Association) and has a wireless network in Cape Town and the greater Western Cape from where it offers low cost wireless services.

Snowball is also a member of the Internet Service Provider's association of South Africa and holds I-ECNS and I-ECS licenses. In 2007 Snowball participated in the ISPA Superteacher sponsorship program.

Apart from wireless Snowball offers uncapped ADSL and virtual private server hosting services.

Snowball is located in Technopark Stellenbosch, Western Cape, South Africa where it owns and operates a data centre.

References

External links
Snowball corporate web site
Snowball LinkedIn profile
Snowball Facebook page
Company Website

Internet service providers of South Africa
Companies based in Stellenbosch